Oliver Maurice Brown (10 October 1908 – 1953), also known as Buster Brown, was an English professional footballer who scored 77 goals from 118 appearances in the Football League playing as a centre forward for Nottingham Forest, Norwich City and Brighton & Hove Albion. He was Brighton's top scorer in the 1933–34 and 1934–35 seasons with, respectively, 15 and 26 goals in all competitions.

Brown was born in Burton upon Trent, Staffordshire, and died in London. His younger brother Ambrose was also a professional footballer who played League football for Chesterfield, Portsmouth and Wrexham.

References

1908 births
1953 deaths
Date of death missing
Sportspeople from Burton upon Trent
English footballers
Association football forwards
Nottingham Forest F.C. players
Norwich City F.C. players
Brighton & Hove Albion F.C. players
English Football League players
Burton Town F.C. players